No-no, No-No or no-no may refer to:

No-hitter, also called a no-no, a baseball game in which a team was not able to record a single hit
Elastic No-No Band, a musical group based in New York City's anti-folk scene, active from 2004–2011
No-No's (Leftovers and Live Songs), is the second official CD release by the antifolk group Elastic No-No Band 
The Very Best of Elastic No-No Band So Far, the first official CD release of the antifolk group Elastic No-No Band
Judy's Little No-No, a 1969 crime film about a go-go dancer who is targeted by gangsters after coming into possession of a priceless jewel
No-No Boy (play), a play written by Ken Narasaki adapted from the novel of the same title by John Okada
No-No Boy, a novel by John Okada about a Japanese-American set in 1946 in Seattle, Washington
 Noo-Noo, a character in the television series Teletubbies
 No-no, baby talk used when talking to a young child, meaning something bad or dangerous; i.e. "a big no-no".
 "No No", a song by Westlife from Westlife
 A No No, a song by Mariah Carey

See also
 "Nobody but Me", Isley Brothers' song noted for repeating the word "no"
Nono (disambiguation)
NONO (protein)